{{DISPLAYTITLE:D1–D2 dopamine receptor heteromer}}

The D1–D2 dopamine receptor heteromer is a receptor heteromer consisting of D1 and D2 protomers.

Structure 
D1 and D2 receptors interact primarily through discrete amino acids in the cytoplasmic regions of each receptor, with no involvement of transmembrane parts. The intracellular loop 3 of the D2 receptor contains two adjacent arginine residues, while the carboxyl tail of the D1 receptor possesses two adjacent glutamic acid residues. The two receptors can form a heteromer complex via a salt bridge between the guanidine moiety and the carboxylic group.

Signal transduction 
The signalling of the D1–D2 receptor heteromer is distinct from that of the parent receptor monomers. It comprises Gq/11 coupling, phospholipase C activation, intracellular calcium release from inositol trisphosphate receptor-sensitive stores, CaMKII activation and BDNF production. In comparison, signalling of the homologous D5–D2 receptor heteromer involves the influx of extracellular calcium.

Physiology 
The D1–D2 receptor is upregulated in individuals with major depression, and especially the ratio D1–D2 to D1 receptor is markedly shifted towards the heteromer. Counteracting this upregulation decreases depressive symptoms. Disruption of the heteromer can be achieved either directly by ligands interacting with the cytoplasmic interface, less directly by ligands that target the extracellular binding site, or indirectly as a downstream effect of classical antidepressant treatment. One study found negative results regarding a shift from Gs/a coupling to Gq/11 signaling; so such dynamics could be mediated by cAMP-dependent cascades rather from phospholipase C regulation.

Chronic THC increased the number of D1-D2 heteromer-expressing neurons, and the number of heteromers within individual neurons in adult monkey striatum.

Ligands 
 SKF-83,959

References

Further reading 

 
 
 
 
 
 
 
 
 
 
 
 
 

G protein-coupled receptors
Receptor heteromers